Philippe, Baron de Rothschild (13 April 1902 – 20 January 1988) was a member of the Rothschild banking dynasty who became a Grand Prix motor racing driver, a screenwriter and playwright, a theatrical producer, a film producer, a poet, and one of the most successful wine growers in the world.

Early life 
Born in Paris, Georges Philippe de Rothschild was the younger son of Baron Henri de Rothschild (1872–1947) (who was a noted playwright under the name André Pascal) and Mathilde Sophie Henriette von Weissweiller (1872–1926). At the outbreak of World War I, 12-year-old Philippe was sent to the safety of the family's vineyard in the village of Pauillac in the Médoc. There, he developed a love of the country and the wine business, an enterprise in his family since 1853, but one his father and grandfather had shown little interest in. As a young man, in sharp contrast to the Rothschild family's staid aristocratic traditions, Philippe de Rothschild became a larger-than-life figure.

Car racing 

During the 1920s, Philippe lived the life of a wealthy playboy, often found in the company of a beautiful woman, usually an actress, at one of the popular night spots in Paris. Philippe's older brother had made friends with Robert Benoist when they served together in the Armée de l'Air during World War I and through this connection, for a short time Philippe took up Grand Prix motor racing. From his father, he inherited the love of fast cars, but wishing to maintain a low profile Philippe used the pseudonym "Georges Philippe" in order to race anonymously.

Rothschild raced his own Bugatti T35C with moderate success, including coming fourth in the 1929 Monaco Grand Prix. He also made a brief appearance for the elite Bugatti works team, but at the end of 1929 he abruptly withdrew from motorsport, to concentrate on the family wine-growing business.

Rothschild made his first competition appearance in the Paris–Nice auto race of 1928, competing in a borrowed Hispano-Suiza. After purchasing a supercharged Bugatti, the ex Targa Florio factory type 37A (37317) T37, he adopted the pseudonym to protect his family. 'Georges Philippe' made his first appearance at the 1928 Bugatti Grand Prix at Le Mans, a race solely for private Bugatti owners where he became second immediately after the winner André Dubonnet.

For 1929, Rothschild decided to upgrade to a full Grand Prix-specification Type 35C. In fact, he was so enamoured with the vehicles, he ordered three. Using one of the new cars, Georges Philippe was entered into the Grand Prix d'Antibes. In a field that included René Dreyfus and Philippe Étancelin, both race winners many times over, Rothschild led the race until he crashed out on the 36th lap. A mere two weeks later, with the car rebuilt, Georges Philippe finished a highly creditable fourth at the inaugural Grand Prix Automobile de Monaco, behind winner William Grover-Williams.

However, he was unfortunate to retire from the following race while running sixth. The third of Rothschild's T35Cs was regularly campaigned by a rather curious acquaintance for a future Baron. A model and exotic dancer at the Casino de Paris, Helene Delangle regularly took to the track under her professional pseudonym Hellé Nice.

Nevertheless, Georges Philippe had attracted sufficient attention to be offered a factory drive alongside Monegasque star Louis Chiron. In his two races for the crack squad, Rothschild ran at the front of the field, before dropping back later in the race due to vehicle troubles. At the 1929 German Grand Prix, around the notorious Nürburgring Nordschleife, Georges Philippe was comfortably ahead of Chiron before contact with a wall caused damage to his Bugatti's axle, slowing the car and allowing Chiron to pass and take the victory.

Unfortunately, increasing fame was wearing Georges Philippe's anonymity rather thin. His final appearance was in the 1930 24 Hours of Le Mans where, driving an American Stutz, he failed to finish. After this Rothschild quietly laid 'Georges Philippe' to rest, and returned to running Château Mouton Rothschild.

In 1935, Rothschild and his friend, Jean Rheims, who were sponsoring a bobsled team, refused to participate in the 1936 Winter Olympics at Garmisch-Partenkirchen, Germany, protesting what they called the "persecution of Germans of Jewish religion."

Wine grower 
Despite the time spent racing automobiles and producing the 1932 film Lac aux dames, the first French "talkie" to gain international recognition (adapted from a novel by Vicki Baum and directed by Marc Allégret, it had a script by Colette and starred Jean-Pierre Aumont and Simone Simon), the energetic Philippe de Rothschild still devoted his energies and innovation to Château Mouton Rothschild in Pauillac.

He was only twenty years old when he took over the operations of the Château Mouton Rothschild vineyards and two years later, in 1924, came up with the unheard of idea of bottling the entire vintage at the Château, an idea that other producers of Premier Cru wines soon copied. Previously, vineyards sold their wines in bulk, leaving the maturing, bottling, labeling and marketing to be handled by the wine merchants. Philippe de Rothschild's idea was to maintain control over the quality of his product and allow marketing of the brand name. Two years later, he developed a de facto price-fixing arrangement among other top Bordeaux producers.

Upon harvesting a crop he considered not up to the high standards of his vineyard, he chose not to sell that year's vintage under the Château label. In 1932 Philippe de Rothschild began to sell this second-string vintage as a good low-cost Bordeaux under the name "Mouton Cadet". The product became so successful that he eventually had to purchase grapes from vineyards throughout the Bordeaux region just to meet the demand. Today, Mouton Cadet is the number-one-selling red wine in the world.

In 1933 Philippe expanded the Mouton-Rothschild estates with the acquisition of the neighboring Château d'Armailhac. By the late 1930s, the wines of Mouton Rothschild were recognized as among the world's best. Nonetheless, the Mouton vineyard was still rated as a "Second Growth" as a result of the Bordeaux Wine Official Classification of 1855 (reputedly due to the vintner's Anglo-Jewish heritage) and Philippe de Rothschild began a lifelong mission to change this judgment.

Personal life
In 1934, Philippe de Rothschild married Élisabeth Pelletier de Chambure (1902–1945), the former wife of Jonkheer , a Belgian nobleman. They had two children: Philippine Mathilde Camille de Rothschild (born 22 November 1933, died 23 August 2014) and Charles Henri de Rothschild (born and died 1938).

Rothschild's late-in-life memoirs (Milady Vine, written in collaboration with his companion, the British theatre director Joan Littlewood) describe a partnership of great passion but also enormous tempestuousness and despair. The couple's difficulties increased when their only son was born tragically deformed and died soon after birth. They eventually separated, and the baron's wife reverted to her maiden name.

World War II 
The outbreak of World War II had serious consequences for the entire Rothschild family, who were Jewish. Following the German occupation of France, Philippe de Rothschild's parents fled to the safety of Lausanne, Switzerland, and the Paris mansion where they had lived became the headquarters for the German Naval Command.

Although he was called up to serve in the French Air Force, the quick fall of France resulted in de Rothschild being arrested in Algeria by the Vichy government and the vineyard property seized. His French citizenship was revoked on 6 September 1940 for what The New York Times described as "having left France without official permission or a valid reason." Released from Vichy custody on 20 April 1941, Philippe de Rothschild made his way to England, where he joined the Free French Forces of General Charles de Gaulle, earning a Croix de Guerre medal. On his return to France following the Allies' liberation, Philippe de Rothschild learned that, although his daughter was safe, the Gestapo had, on charges of attempting to cross a line of demarcation with a forged permit, deported his estranged wife in 1941 to Ravensbrück concentration camp where she diedthe cause of her death remains unresolvedon 23 March 1945. Élisabeth Pelletier de Chambure was the only member of the Rothschilds to be murdered in The Holocaust.

Postwar 
Devastated, Rothschild had to deal with problems at his vineyard as well. The departing German army had done considerable damage to Chateau Mouton Rothschild. Together with dedicated employees, he put his energy into restoring the vineyard and by the early 1950s was once again producing wine.

At the same time, the multi-talented Rothschild returned to participation in the theatrical world, teaming up with Gaston Bonheur to write in both English and French the play Lady Chatterley's Lover. Based on the D. H. Lawrence novel, their play was later made into a motion picture starring Danielle Darrieux. In 1952 Rothschild and Bonheur wrote the script for the film La Demoiselle et son revenant. Philippe de Rothschild was an accomplished poet and in 1952 his poem Vendange inspired Darius Milhaud to write a three-act ballet for the Paris Opera. He also translated Elizabethan poetry and the plays of Christopher Fry.

In 1954, Rothschild married a longtime mistress, Pauline Fairfax Potter (1908–1976), a Paris-born American who had been the head fashion designer at Hattie Carnegie. After their marriage, she used her aesthetic talents to help restore an old storage building on the estate, converting it into an opulent home, and became known as a tastemaker in the worlds of fashion and interior design.

In 1973, Château Mouton Rothschild became the only French vineyard to ever achieve reclassification to First Growth, thanks to decades of relentless lobbying. Subsequently, the owner of Château d'Yquem sued unsuccessfully to have the reclassification reversed as illegitimate. After his Mouton Rothschild lost to a California wine in the Judgment of Paris, he "phoned one of the judges and asked haughtily, 'What are you doing to my wines? It took me forty years to become classified as First Growth!'"

Rothschild purchased Château Clerc Milon, a fifth-growth classified vineyard strategically located next to his own property. After achieving his lifelong goal with the 1973 upgrading of Chateau Mouton Rothschild to Premier Cru status, and after the historic results of the Paris Wine Tasting of 1976, he began looking beyond France for wine-growing opportunities and in 1980 announced a joint venture with the respected American wine grower, Robert Mondavi, to form the Opus One Winery in Oakville, California.

In 1997, under the direction of Rothschild's daughter Philippine, Château Mouton-Rothschild teamed up with Concha y Toro of Chile to produce a Cabernet Sauvignon based, Bordeaux-style red wine in a new winery built in Chile's Maipo Valley, the Almaviva.

Baron Philippe de Rothschild remained active in the wine business until he died in 1988 at the age of 85, whereupon his daughter assumed control of the company. She has also had a successful career as a theatre actress under the stage name "Philippine Pascal".

Arts 
As an offshoot of self-bottling, Philippe also came up with the idea of having his labels designed by famous artists. In 1946, this became a prominent and traditional part of the vineyard's image, with labels created by great painters and sculptors such as Jean Cocteau, Leonor Fini, Henry Moore, Marie Laurencin, Georges Braque, Salvador Dalí, Jacques Villon, Pierre Alechinsky, Joan Miró, Marc Chagall, Pablo Picasso, César, Jean-Paul Riopelle, Andy Warhol, and other notables.

In 1962 at Mouton the Rothschilds created the Museum of Wine in Art; here a collection of art works covering three millennia of wine is on display, including original art by Pablo Picasso and rare glassware.

See also 
 List of wine personalities

References

Further reading 

 Chittenden, Maurice, and Ed Habershon. "Rothschilds choke on a wine tasting". The Sunday Times (London), 28 May 2006.  Accessed 19 June 2008.
 Echikson, William. Noble Rot: A Bordeaux Wine Revolution. New York: W. W. Norton, 2006. .
 Littlewood, Joan. Baron Philippe: The Very Candid Autobiography of Baron Philippe De Rothschild. London: Crown Publishers, 1985. .
The life of Georges Philippe at GrandPrix.com 

1902 births
1988 deaths
French film producers
20th-century French Jews
French racing drivers
French socialites
French viticulturists
Philippe
French military personnel of World War II
Grand Prix drivers
24 Hours of Le Mans drivers
French winemakers
Recipients of the Croix de Guerre 1939–1945 (France)
Sailors at the 1928 Summer Olympics – 6 Metre
Male sailors
Jewish French writers
French memoirists
Olympic sailors of France
20th-century memoirists